Pingtan County is a county comprising 126 islands in the Taiwan Strait, it is under the administration of the prefecture-level city of Fuzhou, the capital of Fujian Province, China. Now it is also the subject of newly founded Pingtan Comprehensive Pilot Zone. The main island is Haitan Island (Hāi-tàng Dō).

History
During the Qing Dynasty, Pingtan Ting was created. In 1913, Pingtan County was established.

On September 27–28, 2016, Typhoon Megi brought torrential rains across Pingtan. Bus lines resumed normal operations on September 29.

Geography 

Niushan Island is located in the eastern part of the county. To the east is the Taiwan Strait. The area is the closest place in mainland China (PRC) to the main island of Taiwan.

Climate
Pingtan, by virtue of its maritime location, has a moderated climate, with high humidity and minimal diurnal temperature variation. Under the Köppen climate classification, it has a humid subtropical climate (Cfa), with mild winters and hot, humid summers, though much cooler than inland places. The bulk of the rainfall annually occurs in spring and early summer, while autumn and early winter is the driest time of the year. Freezing temperatures have never been recorded here.

Administrative divisions
The county executive, legislature and judiciary is in Tancheng Town, colloquially called Pingtan, together with the CPC and PSB branches. The county administers 7 towns and 8 townships, accounting for 200 neighbourhood and village committees.

Towns
 Tancheng Tàng-siàng Déng
 Su'ao (Su-ao) Sŭ-ó̤ Déng 
 Liushui (Liu-shui)  Làu-cuōi Déng
 Aoqian Ó̤-sèng Déng 
 Beicuo Báe̤k-chió Déng
 Pingyuan Bìng-nguòng Déng
 Aodong  Ngò̤-dĕ̤ng Déng

Townships
 Baiqing Băh-chăng Hiŏng
 Yutou Sê̤ṳ-tàu Hiŏng
 Dalian Duâi-liêng Hiŏng
 Luyang Lù-iòng Hiŏng
 Zhonglou Dṳ̆ng-làu Hiŏng
 Dongxiang Dĕ̤ng-siòng Hiŏng 
 Lancheng Làng-siàng Hiŏng 
 Nanhai Nàng-hāi Hiŏng

Economy
Agricultural products include sweet potatoes and peanuts among others. To the east of the county is the Niushan fishery which produces yellow fish and cutlassfish in abundance among others. Tangyu zicai is a local speciality. Mineral resources include coal, iron, and quartz. Industries include mining, salt making, fishery processing, seafood processing, machinery, and shipbuilding. Handicrafts include scrimshaw.

References

External links

Pingtan,China  Pingtan Government official website 
【大陸尋奇#1829】福建平潭 海上絲路 20190825 ('Dalu Xunqi #1829: Fujian Pingtan, an Oceanic Silk Road- August 25, 2019') 
平潭综合实验区管委会办公室关于印发平潭综合实验区（平潭县）乡镇行政区划调整突发事件应急处置预案的通知 

Fuzhou
Island counties of China
County-level divisions of Fujian